Rosa 'Easy Does It',  (aka HARpageant ), is a floribunda rose cultivar, bred by Jack Harkness  before 2006. The new rose variety was created from the hybridization of stock parents, 'Queen Charlotte', 'Della Balfour' and 'Baby Love'. It was named an All-America Rose Selections winner in 2010.

Description
'Easy Does It' is a medium bushy, upright shrub, 3 to 4 ft (90–121 cm) in height with a 2 to 3 ft (60–91 cm) spread. Blooms are large, 4—5 in (10—12.7 cm) in diameter, with 26 to 40 petals. The plant bears small clusters of cupped, ruffled or scalloped flowers that open from long, ovoid buds.  The flowers display various shades of orange-apricot to golden-pink, eventually fading to pink. The rose has a moderate, fruity fragrance and medium-sized glossy, light green foliage. 'Easy Does It' is very disease resistant and blooms continuously throughout its growing season. The plants does well in USDA zone 6 and warmer.

Awards 
 All-America Rose Selections (AARS) winner, USA, (2010)

See also
Garden roses
Rose Hall of Fame
List of Award of Garden Merit roses

References

 

Easy Does It